Luc Albert Moreau (9 December 1882 – 25 April 1948) was a French painter. His work was part of the painting event in the art competition at the 1948 Summer Olympics.

References

1882 births
1948 deaths
20th-century French painters
20th-century French male artists
French male painters
Olympic competitors in art competitions
Painters from Paris